Richthofen (aka  Richthofen, The Red Knight of the Air and Richthofen, The Red Ace of Germany) is a 1927 German silent war film directed by Desider Kertesz and Peter Joseph. The film was subsequently re-mastered with sound and music effects and re-released in the United States in 1929. The film stars Georg Burghardt, Sybil Moore and Arne Molander. Richthofen was the first film to portray the life of the First World War fighter pilot Manfred von Richthofen.

Plot
The life of Baron Manfred von Richthofen is chronicled. Aerial battles are recreated with the film culminating in his death. In 1925, the German Government requested that von Richthofen's body should be interred at the Invalidenfriedhof Cemetery in Berlin, where many German military heroes and past leaders were burial. Richthofen's body received a state funeral, which is featured in the film.

Cast

 Carl Walther Meyer as Manfred von Richthofen
 Georg Burghardt as de Val
 Sybil Moore as Ivonne de Val (wife)
 Arne Molander as Chsrles de Val (son) 
 Helga Thomas as Suzanne de Val (daughter) 
 Angelo Ferrari as Ximenes
 Egon von Jordan as Werner Dewall
 Hugo Döblin as administrator
 Gert Eitel Langner as Young aviation officer
 Fred Cassner as Dewall's adjutant

Production
Although most of Richthofen was recreated, the actual newsreel footage of his state funeral was included. A number of aircraft were used in the production: Fokker Dr.1, Nieuport 17, Albatros D.V and Airco DH.9.

After its initial release, producer Bud Pollard acquired the rights to Richthofen, and subsequently re-mastered the film with sound and music. Capitalizing on the legend of Germany's  "Ace of aces", Pollard renamed the film, Richthofen, The Red Knight of the Air. Later in distribution in the United States, the film was renamed, Richthofen, The Red Ace of Germany.

Reception
Aviation film historian James Farmer considered Richthofen one of the first films to depict the aerial conflicts of World War I.

References

Notes

Bibliography

 Farmer, James H. Celluloid Wings: The Impact of Movies on Aviation. Blue Ridge Summit, Pennsylvania: Tab Books Inc., 1984. .
 Paris, Michael. From the Wright Brothers to Top Gun: Aviation, Nationalism, and Popular Cinema. Manchester, UK: Manchester University Press, 1995. .
 Pendo, Stephen. Aviation in the Cinema. Lanham, Maryland: Scarecrow Press, 1985. .
 Soister, John T. and Henry Nicolella. Down from the Attic: Rare Thrillers of the Silent Era through the 1950s. Jefferson, North Carolina: McFarland & Co., 2016. .

External links
 
 Richthofen, The Red Knight of the Air

1927 films
1929 films
Films of the Weimar Republic
German silent feature films
German war films
1920s war films
World War I aviation films
World War I films based on actual events
Biographical films about military personnel
Manfred von Richthofen
German black-and-white films
German aviation films
Silent war films
1920s German films
1920s German-language films